Nurul Islam Talukder (born 1 July 1950) is a Bangladeshi politician and the incumbent Jatiya Sangsad member representing the Bogra-3 constituency since 2014.

Early life
Talukder was born on 1 July 1950. He has a L.L.B. degree.

Career
Talukder was elected to Jatiya Sangsad from Bogra-3 as a Jatiya Party candidate in 2014 and was re-elected in 2018.

References

Living people
1950 births
10th Jatiya Sangsad members
11th Jatiya Sangsad members
Jatiya Party politicians
Place of birth missing (living people)